Pierre Brûlart, lord of Genlis and Crosne (c. 1535 – 12 April 1608) was a French statesman of the sixteenth century.

Offices
 Secretary of State under Charles IX of France and Henri III
 Secretary of State for Foreign Affairs from 8 June 1569 to 1588.

Family 
He was the son of Noel Brulart, Lord of Crosne 1557 and Isabeau Bourdin, lady Chapet (1589).
He married Madeleine Chevalier (1610 / 1611) on 10 September 1571, with children:
 Gilles
 Charles
 + Christmas
 Peter
 + Louis / 1646
 Magdalena
 Nicolas 1659
 Mary 1631
 Elizabeth

He belonged to a house from St Martin at Blois.
He was Secretary to the King in 1557, and commandments of Queen Catherine de' Medici in 1564. At the death of Florimond III Robertet d'Alluye, King Charles IX appointed him Secretary of State from 8 June 1569.
He was at the king's marriage with Elizabeth of Austria, was reading the contract and signed the ratification.

1535 births
1608 deaths
French Foreign Ministers
16th-century French diplomats